James Matthews may refer to:

Jim Matthews (politician), American politician from Pennsylvania
James Ewen Matthews (1869–1950), Canadian Member of Parliament for Brandon
James Herbert Matthews (1883–1972), Co-operative Commonwealth Federation member of the Canadian House of Commons
James Tilly Matthews (1770–1815), British merchant
Jimmy Matthews (1884–1943), Australian cricketer
James Matthews (footballer) (1876–1963), Australian rules footballer who played for North Adelaide and cricket for South Australia
James Matthews (writer) (born 1929), South African writer
Jim Matthews (rugby league), Australian rugby league footballer
James Matthews (racing driver) (born 1975), British formula racing driver
James Mathews (Australian politician) (1865–1934)
James Matthews (architect) (1819–1898), architect and Lord Provost of Aberdeen
James Campbell Matthews (1844–1930), Albany, New York attorney and judge
James Duncan Matthews (1850–1890), Scottish zoologist
James Robert Matthews (1889–1978), Scottish botanist
James S. Matthews, Louisiana state legislator
James Tilly Matthews, (1770–1815), London tea broker committed to Bethlem psychiatric hospital
James William Matthews (1895–1982), New Zealand newspaper editor, gardening writer and horticulturist
James Brander Matthews (1852–1929), American writer

See also
Jim Matthews (disambiguation)
James Mathews (disambiguation)